Kahnok Ladi (also Romanized as Kahnok Ladī) is a village in Dalgan Rural District, in the Central District of Dalgan County, Sistan and Baluchestan Province, Iran. At the 2006 census, its population was 829, in 163 families.

References 

Populated places in Dalgan County